Laura Bradley Park, also known as Bradley Park, is a park in Peoria, Illinois, United States. It historically contained a wading pool for children and flower gardens. , it offers sports facilities, picnic sites, hiking opportunities on paved tracks, and a Japanese bridge.

The  park was given to the city of Peoria by Lydia Moss Bradley (1816-1908) in memory of her daughter Laura Bradley, who died in 1864 at the age of 14.

Japanese Garden 
A Japanese garden area was constructed by Peoria parks workers under the direction of Chicago Japanese garden builder T.R. Otsuka in Spring 1918, according to that year’s report of the park district board of trustees: “After the general plan had been adopted by the board, Mr. T.R. Otsuka, a Japanese landscape artist, from Chicago, was engaged to supervise the laying out of the walks, placing of stones, and general planning. A Japanese temple, or tea house, was constructed on the highest elevation.”

References

Parks in Illinois
Peoria, Illinois
Protected areas of Peoria County, Illinois